The Hunter Sportsplex is a multi-purpose sports facility located in Manhattan, New York, within the campus of Hunter College of the City University of New York.

It is the home of the Hunter College Hawks. Basketball, volleyball and wrestling in addition to other sports are played in the main gymnasium. An auxiliary gymnasium hosts tennis matches. The facility is also home to the Gotham Girls Roller Derby of the Women's Flat Track Derby Association (WFTDA).

References

External links
Official website

Sports venues in Manhattan
Basketball venues in New York City
Wrestling venues in New York City
College basketball venues in the United States
College wrestling venues in the United States
Tennis venues in New York City
1982 establishments in New York City
Sports venues completed in 1982
Hunter College